The 2018 UNAF U-17 Tournament is an international football tournament hosted by Tunisia from 20 to 28 August 2018.

Teams
Sources:

Algeria
Coach: Sofiane Boudjella

Libya

Morocco
Coach: Jamal Sellami

Tunisia

References

Squads